William Raeside (24 March 1892 – 15 November 1964) was a Scottish football player and coach.

Early and personal life
Raeside was born in Paisley on 24 March 1892.

Playing career
Raeside playing career, which included claims he played in both Scotland and England, is unverified.

Coaching career
Raeside managed Spanish club Celta Vigo under a pseudonym, W. H. Cowan. After leaving Spain he returned to Scotland to work as an accountant.

In 1937 he moved to South America to coach Nacional of Uruguay. He returned to the United Kingdom to work as a scout for Arsenal. In 1945 he returned to Latin America to manage Mexican club Asturias. He  moved to Argentina in 1947 with Newell's Old Boys, later returning to Mexico with Guadalajara in 1950. He returned to the United Kingdom to manage English club Cheltenham Town, before a brief return to Mexico to work with Atlante as a technical director. His last known involvement in football was an unsuccessful application to become Dundee United manager in 1954.

Later life and death
Raeside died on 15 November 1964 in Old Kilpatrick, where he had retired to.

References

1892 births
1964 deaths
Scottish football managers
Scottish expatriate football managers
RC Celta de Vigo managers
Club Nacional de Football managers
Arsenal F.C. non-playing staff
Newell's Old Boys managers
C.D. Guadalajara managers
Cheltenham Town F.C. managers
Atlante F.C. non-playing staff
Scottish expatriate sportspeople in Uruguay
Expatriate football managers in Spain
Expatriate football managers in Uruguay
Scottish expatriate sportspeople in Mexico
Expatriate football managers in Mexico
Scottish expatriate sportspeople in Spain
Expatriate football managers in Argentina
Scottish expatriate sportspeople in Argentina
Sportspeople from Paisley, Renfrewshire